Hyatt is a hotel chain.

Hyatt may also refer to:

People

Given name
Hyatt Bass, American novelist, screenwriter, film director and philanthropist
Hyatt Robert von Dehn, American founder of the Hyatt hotel chain

Surname
Alpheus Hyatt (1838–1902), American naturalist and paleontologist
Art Hyatt (1912–1991), American basketball player
Charles Hyatt (1931–2007), Jamaican actor
Christopher Hyatt (1943–2008), American occultist, author, and founder of the Extreme Individual Institute
Chuck Hyatt (1908–1978), American basketball player
Dave Hyatt (born 1972), American software engineer
Derek Hyatt (1931–2015), British landscape painter
Ham Hyatt (1884–1963), American baseball player
Joel Hyatt (born 1950), American businessman, attorney, and politician
Rev. John Hyatt (1767–1826), English nonconformist pastor and missionary
John Wesley Hyatt (1837–1920), American inventor
Mark Hyatt (1940-1972) English poet and novelist
Michael Hyatt, American actress
Missy Hyatt (born 1963), female professional wrestling valet
Mitch Hyatt (born 1997), American football player
Robert Hyatt (born 1948), professor of computer science
Rohail Hyatt (born 1966), Pakistani record producer, keyboardist, and composer
Ron Jeremy Hyatt (born 1953), American pornographic actor and stand-up comedian
Stanley Portal Hyatt (1877–1914), British explorer and writer
Terry Hyatt (born 1957), American serial killer
Thaddeus Hyatt (1816–1901), American inventor and abolitionist
Willard Hyatt (1883–1967), American basketball player

Arts, entertainment, and media

Fictional characters
Hyatt (Excel Saga), an anime character
Tommy Hyatt, a character in the movie Alice Doesn't Live Here Anymore (1974) and the subsequent television series Alice (1976–85)

Military
Chilean destroyer Hyatt, a destroyer commissioned in 1929 and decommissioned in 1962
Chilean submarine Hyatt, a submarine commissioned in 1976 and decommissioned in the 1990s

See also
Hyatt Regency walkway collapse, a 1981 Kansas City, Missouri engineering disaster
Hyatts, Ohio

Hyatt Hotels and Resorts